Protein pellino homolog 1 is a protein that in humans is encoded by the PELI1 gene.

References

Further reading